Schambach may refer to:

Georg Schambach (1811–1879), German educator and folklorist
R. W. Schambach (1926–2012), American televangelist, pastor and author
Stephan Schambach (born 1970), German entrepreneur in the area of E-Commerce
Schambach (Riedenburg), a river of Bavaria, Germany, tributary of the Altmühl at Riedenburg
Schambach (Treuchtlingen), a river of Bavaria, Germany, tributary of the Altmühl at Treuchtlingen
Schambach (Arnsberg), a river of Bavaria, Germany, tributary of the Altmühl at Arnsberg